The 2006–07 UEFA Champions League group stage matches took place between 12 September and 6 December 2006.

All of the Pot 1 and Pot 2 draw seeds advanced, the first time this had occurred since a format of 32 teams and 16 progressing was introduced in 1999–2000.

Seeding structure

Groups
Times are CET/CEST, as listed by UEFA (local times are in parentheses).

Group A

Group B

Group C

Group D

Group E

Group F

Group G

Group H

Notes

External links
2006–07 UEFA Champions League season
UEFA club ranking 2006
Europe's finest ready for draw - seeding pots

Group Stage
UEFA Champions League group stages

fr:Ligue des champions de l'UEFA 2006-2007#Phase de groupes